Jhapat Singh Bhujel (born 1968) is a Nepalese boxer. He competed in the men's light welterweight event at the 1988 Summer Olympics.

References

External links
 

1968 births
Living people
Nepalese male boxers
Olympic boxers of Nepal
Boxers at the 1988 Summer Olympics
Place of birth missing (living people)
Light-welterweight boxers